Kula Norinska is a village and a municipality in the Dubrovnik-Neretva County in southeastern Croatia.

Geography 
The municipality is situated on the northern border of the Dubrovnik-Neretva County. It borders the City of Ploče, the City of Opuzen, the City of Metković, the Pojezerje Municipality, and the Zažablje Municipality. It borders Bosnia and Herzegovina to the north.

Kula Norinska Fort 

Kula Norinska(literally: Norin Fort) is a 16th-century fort next to the Neretva, opposite the mouth of the stream Norin, which was built by the Ottomans to defend against Venetian incursions. It's a protected cultural good.

Demographics 
For the municipality:

The list of registered settlements is as follows:

For the village:

Education 
The elementary school "Kula Norinska" was founded in 1908, and in 1959 it started functioning as an eight-grade school. Because more space was needed, it was expanded on 1 February 1966.

References

Populated places in Dubrovnik-Neretva County
Municipalities of Croatia